Dante John Calabria (born November 8, 1973) is an Italian-American former professional basketball player and coach. He is currently the head coach of Bethel Park High School in Bethel Park, Pennsylvania.

College career
Calabria played college basketball at North Carolina under coach Dean Smith from 1992 to 1996. He was a member of the Tar Heels’ 1993 national championship team.

Professional career
He moved to Europe for his professional career, spending a good part of it in the Italian Serie A.

International career
A dual national of United States and Italy, he played for the Italy national basketball team.

Coaching career
In 2011, Calabria was named director of basketball operations at UNC Wilmington under coach Buzz Peterson. In 2012, he was moved to a full assistant role with the departure of Brooks Lee. Calabria then had coaching stints at Montverde Academy in Florida and at Basket Taranto in Italy, before joining NAIA school Keiser University as an assistant coach under Rollie Massimino. After Massimino's death, Calabria was named Keiser's Interim Head Coach in September 2017, with the Interim tag being removed in January 2018.

In June 2018, Calabria became an assistant coach of Larry Brown for the Italian basketball club Auxilium Torino. Calabria spent two seasons as an assistant coach at Barry University in Florida. He resigned in September 2021. On May 25, 2022, he was named the head basketball coach of Bethel Park High School in Bethel Park, Pennsylvania.

References

External links 
 Serie A profile  Retrieved 11 August 2015
 UNCW coaching bio

1973 births
Living people
American expatriate basketball people in France
American expatriate basketball people in Greece
American expatriate basketball people in Italy
American expatriate basketball people in Spain
American men's basketball players
Aris B.C. players
Barry Buccaneers men's basketball coaches
Basket Livorno players
Basketball players from Pennsylvania
Élan Béarnais players
Fort Wayne Fury players
Fortitudo Pallacanestro Bologna players
Italian men's basketball players
JDA Dijon Basket players
Lega Basket Serie A players
Liga ACB players
North Carolina Tar Heels men's basketball players
Olimpia Milano players
Pallacanestro Cantù players
Pallacanestro Treviso players
Pallacanestro Trieste players
Shooting guards
UNC Wilmington Seahawks men's basketball coaches
Valencia Basket players
Vanoli Cremona players